John Hope (6 February 1841 – 12 November 1910) was a New Zealand cricketer. He played four first-class matches for Otago between 1863 and 1867.

See also
 List of Otago representative cricketers

References

External links
 

1841 births
1910 deaths
New Zealand cricketers
Otago cricketers
Cricketers from Derbyshire